Hulice is a municipality and village in Benešov District in the Central Bohemian Region of the Czech Republic. It has about 300 inhabitants.

Administrative parts
The village of Rýzmburk is an administrative part of Hulice.

References

Villages in Benešov District